Theissen is a surname, and may refer to many people.

 Gerd Theissen (born 1943), German theologian
 Joel Theissen (born 1986), Australian footballer
 Mario Theissen (born 1952), motorsport director

See also
 Theißen, a village in Saxony-Anhalt, Germany
 Thiessen (disambiguation)
 Theiss (disambiguation)
 Thiess (disambiguation)